The Port Malabar Invitational was a golf tournament on the LPGA Tour from 1968 to 1969. It was played at the Port Malabar Country Club in Palm Bay, Florida.

Winners
1969 Kathy Whitworth
1968 Mickey Wright

References

Former LPGA Tour events
Golf in Florida
Palm Bay, Florida
1968 establishments in Florida
1969 disestablishments in Florida
Recurring sporting events established in 1968
Recurring sporting events disestablished in 1969
Women's sports in Florida